This page is a list of the rulers of the Principality of Salerno.

When Prince Sicard of Benevento was assassinated by Radelchis in 839, the people of Salerno promptly proclaimed his brother, Siconulf, prince. War raged between Radelchis and Siconulf until Emperor Louis II came down and forced a peace in 851, confirming Siconulf as prince of Salerno. The chronology is very confusing from then on until the assassination of Adhemar, when a new dynasty took the throne.

Salerno was besieged by the Normans of Robert Guiscard and Prince Richard I of Capua until it fell on 13 December 1076. Prince Gisulf II surrendered the next year and the principality, the final Lombard state in Italy, fell. Salerno became the capital of Guiscard's duchy of Apulia, Calabria, and Sicily.

"Prince of Salerno" was also a title created by Charles I of Naples (reigned 1266-1285) for his son, later Charles II of Naples. It was regularly used for the heirs of the Kings of Naples and later the Two Sicilies. In the fourteenth century, most of the province of Salerno became the territory of the Princes of Sanseverino.

List
 Siconulf (840–851)
 Sico (II) (851–853)
 Peter (853)
 Adhemar (853–861)
 Guaifer (861–880)
 Guaimar I (880–900)
 Guaimar II (900–946)
 Gisulf I (946–978)
 Landulf of Conza (973), usurper
 Pandulf I (978–981)
 Pandulf II (981)
 Manso (981–983) co-ruling with. . .
 John I (981–983)
 John II (983–994/9)
 Guaimar III [or IV] (994/9–1027)
 Guaimar IV [or V] (1027–1052)
 Pandulf (III) (1052), usurper
 Gisulf II (1052–1077)

Notes

References

 
Salerno Princes
Salerno

ca:Principat de Salern